Diane of the Green Van is a lost 1919 silent film directed by Wallace Worsley and starring Alma Rubens.

Cast
Alma Rubens as Diane Westfall
Nigel Barrie as Philip Poynter
Lamar Johnstone as Carl Granberry
Josephine Crowell as Aunt Agatha
Harry von Meter as Baron Tregar
Wedgwood Nowell as Prince Ronador
Ed Brady as- Themar
Alfred Hollingsworth as Mic-co
Irene Rich as Keela
Sydney Hayes as

References

External links
Diane of the Green Van at IMDb.com

1919 films
American silent feature films
Lost American films
Films directed by Wallace Worsley
American black-and-white films
1910s American films